Nanna Koerstz Madsen (born 23 October 1994) is a Danish professional golfer who plays on the American LPGA Tour and maintains membership of the Ladies European Tour (LET). She won the 2022 Honda LPGA Thailand and made history becoming the first Dane to win an LPGA Tour event. She played in the 2021 Solheim Cup and represented Denmark at the 2016 Summer Olympics in Rio de Janeiro where she finished tied for 13th, and at the 2020 Summer Olympics in Tokyo where she finished tied for 9th.

Amateur career
Madsen had a successful amateur career and she won both the 2012 Danish Women's Match Play Championship and the 2013 Danish Women's Stroke Play Championship. She was 2013 British Ladies Amateur Championship stroke play medalist with rounds of 69 and 72.

At the end of the season 2014, Madsen finished as the best European amateur player on the World Amateur Golf Ranking.

She played college golf with the South Carolina Gamecocks women's golf team at the University of South Carolina, winning the Mercedes-Benz Intercollegiate, before turning professional after only one semester.

Professional career
Madsen earned her LET card by winning the Lalla Aicha Tour School Final Qualifying and was a Ladies European Tour rookie in 2015. On the 2015 Ladies European Tour, she finished 9th on the Order of Merit. In 2016, she won the Tipsport Golf Masters and finished 6th on the Order of Merit.

Madsen devoted the 2017 season to earning a membership on the LPGA Tour by playing the season on the Symetra Tour where she became a three-time winner resulting in her becoming the 12th player to earn a "Battlefield Promotion" to the LPGA Tour, playing in three events between late August and early September. She started as a rookie on the LPGA Tour from the beginning of the 2018 season.

In 2019, she was runner-up at the Indy Women in Tech Championship. She finished tied for 3rd at the 2021 ANA Inspiration.

Madsen captured the 2022 Honda LPGA Thailand to become the first LPGA Tour winner from Denmark. After a hard-fought battle with China's Lin Xiyu, she drained a 10-foot putt for eagle on the second playoff hole to take the title. After the win, her world ranking jumped up 22 places, from #55 to #33.

After her playoff loss to Atthaya Thitikul in the JTBC Classic on 27 March, her world ranking jumped up 13 places, to #19.

Amateur wins
2009 Danish Junior Ladies
2010 Danish Junior Ladies
2012 DGU Elite Tour Damer II, Danish Women's Match Play Championship
2013 Danish Women's Stroke Play Championship, European Club Trophy
2014 European Nations Cup (individual), DGU Elite Tour Damer II, Danish International Championship, Mercedes-Benz Intercollegiate
Source:

Professional wins (6)

LPGA Tour wins (1)

LPGA Tour playoff record (1–1)

Ladies European Tour wins (1)

Symetra Tour wins (3)

Swedish Golf Tour wins (1)

Results in LPGA majors
Results not in chronological order before 2019 or in 2020.

^ The Evian Championship was added as a major in 2013.

CUT = missed the half-way cut
NT = no tournament
"T" = tied

Summary

Most consecutive cuts made – 2 (three times)
Longest streak of top-10s – 2 (2021 Evian – 2022 Chevron)

LPGA Tour career summary

^ Official as of 27 March 2022 
*Includes matchplay and other tournaments without a cut.

World ranking 
Position in Women's World Golf Rankings at the end of each calendar year.

Team appearances
Amateur
European Girls' Team Championship (representing the Denmark): 2012
Espirito Santo Trophy (representing Denmark): 2012, 2014
European Ladies' Team Championship (representing Denmark): 2013, 2014

Professional
The Queens (representing Europe): 2015, 2016
Solheim Cup (representing Europe): 2021 (winners)

Solheim Cup record

References

External links

Danish female golfers
Ladies European Tour golfers
LPGA Tour golfers
Olympic golfers of Denmark
Golfers at the 2016 Summer Olympics
Golfers at the 2020 Summer Olympics
South Carolina Gamecocks women's golfers
Sportspeople from Copenhagen
1994 births
Living people